Sarcopteryx is a genus of about 12 rainforest tree species known to science, of the plant family Sapindaceae. They occur in Australia, New Guinea and the Moluccas.

They have hairy leaves and twigs, polygamous flowers and bird attracting brightly coloured, capsule fruits.

The generic name Sarcopteryx translates to "fleshy wing", as the fruit can be angled, thick or wing shaped. The Greek sarco means fleshy, and pteron is "a wing".

Species
 Sarcopteryx acuminata  – Qld, Australia
 Sarcopteryx brachyphylla  – New Guinea
 Sarcopteryx caudata  – New Guinea
 Sarcopteryx coriacea  – Vogelkop Peninsula, New Guinea
 Sarcopteryx crispata  – New Guinea
 Sarcopteryx martyana  – Qld, Australia
 Sarcopteryx montana  – Qld, Australia
 Sarcopteryx reticulata  – Qld, Australia
 Sarcopteryx rigida  – New Guinea
 Sarcopteryx rubiginosa  – New Guinea
 Sarcopteryx squamosa  – New Guinea
 Sarcopteryx stipata , steelwood, corduroy – Qld, NSW, Australia

References

External links

Flora of Malesia
Flora of New Guinea
Flora of Papua New Guinea
Flora of New South Wales
Flora of Queensland
Sapindales of Australia
Sapindaceae
Sapindaceae genera